K. S. Ravi (1959 2010
) was an Indian film director of Tamil and Telugu films. His films included a mixture of genres from dramas to action thrillers.

Personal life 
Ravi was born in 1959 in Paramakudi, Ramnad district. He was born to Mr. Karpurasundharam, an ex-serviceman, and Mrs. Vasantha Karpurasundharam. He has three siblings: Rajan, Kripakaran and Latha. He married Ms. Sumathy, and had a daughter named Aishwarya.

Death
He died of cardiac arrest on September 6, 2010.

Awards 
Ravi secured the most acclaimed "Nandi Award" for his first movie, Aagraham.

Filmography

References

External links
 

Tamil film directors
Nandi Award winners
1959 births
2010 deaths
Telugu film directors
People from Ramanathapuram district
Tamil screenwriters
Screenwriters from Tamil Nadu
Film directors from Tamil Nadu
20th-century Indian film directors